Frontier Days is a 1934 American western film directed by Robert F. Hill and starring Bill Cody, Ada Ince and Wheeler Oakman. It was produced by independent Poverty Row outfit Altmount Pictures for release as a second feature. Location shooting took place in the Alabama Hills in California.

Synopsis
A detective working for Wells Fargo goes undercover as The Pinto Kid to investigate the killings of a series of stagecoach drivers. However this leads to himself being accused of the murder of one of them.

Cast
 Bill Cody as 	Bill Maywood - aka The Pinto Kid
 Ada Ince as Beth Wilson
 Wheeler Oakman as enry Jethrow
 Bill Cody Jr. as 	Bart Wilson 
 Franklyn Farnum as 	George Wilson
 Lafe McKee as Hank Wilson
 Victor Potel as 	Deputy Tex Hatch 
 William Desmond as Sheriff Barnes 
 Robert McKenzie as	Casey 
 Harry Martell as 	Deputy Rio 
 Barney Beasley as 	Barfly / Deputy 
 Herman Hack as Townsman
 Robert F. Hill as 	Chief Burrows 
 Lew Meehan as 	Deputy 
 Fred Parker as 	Doctor 
 Chico as	Chico - Pinto Kid's Horse

References

Bibliography
 Pitts, Michael R. Poverty Row Studios, 1929–1940. McFarland & Company, 2005.

External links
 

1934 films
1934 Western (genre) films
1930s English-language films
American Western (genre) films
Films directed by Robert F. Hill
American black-and-white films
Films shot in California
1930s American films